Erik Albin Almlöf (20 December 1891 – 18 January 1971) was a Swedish athlete who specialized in the triple jump. He competed at the 1912 Summer Olympics in Stockholm where he won the bronze medal. Due to World War I no Olympics were held in 1916, but Almlöf returned to the 1920 Summer Olympics in Antwerp, Belgium, where he won his second Olympic bronze medal.

Between the 1912 and 1920 Olympics Almlöf won two national titles in 1913–14, finished third at the 1914 British AAA Championship, won the 1915–16 Swedish-American meet, won the 1919 Metropolitan (US) title, and was second at the US National Championships, both indoors and outdoors, in 1916. After the 1920 Olympics, Almlöf finished second at the United States – France – Sweden meet. His last major competition was the 1923 Göteborg Games, where he finished fourth. Almlöf was a businessman operating between Sweden and the United States, where he died in 1971.

References

External links 

 

1891 births
1971 deaths
Athletes from Stockholm
Swedish male triple jumpers
Olympic bronze medalists for Sweden
Athletes (track and field) at the 1912 Summer Olympics
Athletes (track and field) at the 1920 Summer Olympics
Olympic athletes of Sweden
Medalists at the 1920 Summer Olympics
Medalists at the 1912 Summer Olympics
Olympic bronze medalists in athletics (track and field)